Tim Waggoner is the author of numerous novels and short stories in the Fantasy, Horror, and Thriller genres.

Education
Waggoner graduated from Wright State University in 1989 with a Master of Arts in English with a Creative Writing Concentration.

He holds BS ed. and MA degrees from Wright State University.

Career
Waggoner has written and published novels for both adult and young readers, including Temple of the Dragonslayer and Return of the Sorceress (both for Wizards of the Coast), Dark Ages: Gangrel and Exalted: A Shadow Over Heaven's Eye (both White Wolf), Necropolis (Five Star), and Defender: Hyperswarm (I-Books). He is also the author of the short story collection All Too Surreal (Prime Books). He has published numerous short stories in the fantasy and horror genres, and his articles on writing have appeared in Writer's Digest, Writers' Journal, New Writer's Magazine, Ohio Writer, Speculations, and Teaching English in the Two-Year College. He has also written the Nekropolis series of urban fantasies and the Ghost Trackers series written in collaboration with Jason Hawes and Grant Wilson of the Ghost Hunters television show. His books for writers include The Art of Writing Genre Fiction, written in collaboration with Michael Knost, and Writing in the Dark, a guide to writing horror and dark fantasy fiction.

A number of his stories have received honorable mentions in various editions of the Year's Best Fantasy and Horror. He won first place in the 1998 Authorlink! New Author Awards Competition and was a finalist for the Darrell Award for Best MidSouth Short Story in 1999. His novella The Men Upstairs was nominated for the 2011 Shirley Jackson Award, and his short story "How to be a Horror Writer" was nominated for the 2018 Shirley Jackson Award. His novella The Winter Box won the 2016 Bram Stoker Award for Superior Achievement in Long Fiction. His how-to-write-horror book Writing in the Dark won the 2020 Bram Stoker Award for Superior Achievement in Nonfiction, and his article "Speaking of Horror" won the 2020 Bram Stoker Award for Superior Achievement in Short Nonfiction.

Teaching
He serves as a professor of English and teaches composition and creative writing at Sinclair Community College in Dayton, Ohio. Waggoner also taught creative writing for many years at Seton Hill University, Pennsylvania, in an innovative low-residency Master of Fine Arts degree program in Writing Popular Fiction.

Personal life

Waggoner grew up in the Dayton, Ohio, area. In addition to writing fiction, Waggoner has worked as a newspaper reporter, magazine editor, and copy editor. He has two daughters from a previous marriage.

Bibliography

Novels
Dying for It (2001)
The Harmony Society (2003)
Gangrel (Dark Ages Vampire) (2004)
Nekropolis (2004)
Defender: Hyperswarm (2004)
Like Death (2005)
Exalted 5: A Shadow Over Heaven's Eye (2005)
A Nightmare on Elm Street: Protege (2005)
Pandora Drive (2006)
Darkness Wakes (2006)
Cross County (2008)
Last of the Lycans (2010)
Beneath the Bones (2012)
The Way of All Flesh (2014)
Grimm: The Killing Time (2014)
Eat the Night (2016)
xXx: the Return of Xander Cage (2017)
Resident Evil: the Final Chapter (2017) novelization of the film of the same name
Kingsman: the Golden Circle (2017) novelization of the film of the same name
Teeth of the Sea (2017)
The Mouth of the Dark (2018)
Blood Island (2019)
They Kill (2019)
Alien: Prototype (2019)
The Forever House (2020)
Your Turn to Suffer (2021)
Halloween Kills (2021), novelization of the slasher film
Planet Havoc (2022)
We Will Rise (2022)

Series

The Blade of the Flame
Thieves of Blood (2006)
Forge of the Mind Slayers (2007)
Sea of Death (2008)

Dragonlance: the New Adventures
Temple of the Dragonslayer (2004)
Return of the Sorceress (2004)

Ghost Trackers
Ghost Trackers with Jason Hawes and Grant Wilson (2011)
Ghost Town with Jason Hawes and Grant Wilson (2012)

Godfire
Orchard of Dreams (2006)
Heart's Wound (2006)

Lady Ruin
Lady Ruin (2010)

Nekropolis
Nekropolis (2009)
Dead Streets (2010)
Dark War (2011)
The Nekropolis Archives (2012) (Omnibus edition of above novels and the short stories "Disarmed and Dangerous," "The Midnight Watch," and "Zombie Interrupted")

Shadow Watch
Night Terrors (2014)
Dream Stalkers (2014)

Stargate
Stargate SG-1: Valhalla (2009)

Supernatural
Supernatural: Carved in Flesh (2013)
Supernatural: The Roads Not Taken (2013)
Supernatural: Mythmaker (2016)
The Men of Letters Bestiary: Winchester Family Edition (2017)
Supernatural: Children of Anubis (2019)

Books on Writing
The Art of Writing Genre Fiction Written with Michael Knost (2018)
Writing in the Dark (2020)
Writing in the Dark: The Workbook (2022)

Collections
All Too Surreal (2002)
Broken Shadows (2009)
Bone Whispers (2013)
Cemetery Dance Select: Tim Waggoner (2017)
Dark And Distant Voices (2017)
Love, Death, and Madness (2018)
A Little Aqua Book of Marine Tales (2019)

Short fiction

A
"Across Silent Seas"
"Alacrity's Spectatorium"
"All Fall Down"
"All in the Execution"
"Along for the Ride"
"Anubis Has Left the Building"
"As Good As a Rest"
"At the Movies"

B
"Best Friends Forever"
"The Big Moment"
"The Blade of the Flame"
"Blackwater Dreams"
"Blame It on the Moonlight"
"Bone Whispers"
"Breathtaking"
"Broken Glass and Gasoline"
"Brothers in Arms"
"Buried Treasure"
"Buyer Beware"

C
"The Castle and Jack"
"Catharsis"
"Collect and Save"
"Conversations Kill"
"Country Roads"

D
"Daddy"
"Darker Than Winter"
"Debut"
"Disarmed and Dangerous"
"Do No Harm"

E
"Every Home Should Have One"
"Exits and Entrances"
"Extern"

F
"The Faces That You Meet"
"Fixer-Upper"
"Foundling"

G
"Ghost in the Graveyard"
"Grandpa Kelly and the Dragon"

H
"Hair of the..."
"Harvest Time"
"Home Security"
"Homebody"
"Horror Show"
"The Hungry Man"
"Huntress"
"Hunt's End"

I
"I Scream, You Scream"

J
"Joyless Forms"
"Just a Simple Country Doctor"

K
"Keeping It Together"
"Knock, Knock"

L
"The Last Warrior"
"Lastjack"
"Long Way Home"
"Loose Upon the Earth a Daemon"

M
"The Man of Her Dreams"
"Mary Alice"
"Meeting Dad"
"The Men Upstairs"
"Met a Pilgrim Shadow"
"Mibs"
"Mirroring"
"Mr. Punch"

N
"Negative Space"
"Newcomer"
"Night Eyes"
"No More Shadows"

O
"Old Times' Sake"
"On the Shelf and Dreaming"
"On the Skids in Another Dimension"
"One Morning at the Stone"
"Open House"
"The Other Woman"
"Outside the Lines"

P
"Picking Up Courtney"
"Portrait of a Horror Writer"
"Preserver"
"Provider"

R
"The Right Thing"
"Rude Awakenings"

S
"The Secret of Bees"
"Seeker"
"The September People"
"Shadow Play"
"Shoofly"
"Simulacrum"
"Skeptic"
"Skull Cathedral"
"Sleepless Eyes"
"Soaring"
"Some Dark Hope"
"The Stars Look Down"
"A Strange and Savage Garden"
"Supernaturally Incorrect"
"Swimming Lessons"

T
"Talia"
"Till Voices Drown Us"
"To Embrace the Serpent"
"The Grabber Man"
"The Tongue is the Sweetest Meat"

U
"Unwoven"

W
"Waters Dark and Deep"
"Weapon of Flesh and Bone"  (In collaboration with R. Davis.)
"When God Opens a Door"
"A Wild Hair"

Z
"Zombie Interrupted"

References

External links
Tim Waggoner's Official Website
Tim Waggoner's Official Blog

1964 births
21st-century American male writers
21st-century American novelists
American fantasy writers
American horror writers
American male novelists
Living people
Seton Hill University
Wright State University alumni